Otryne was a deme of ancient Attica, of the phyle of Aegeis, sending one delegate to the Athenian Boule. 

Its site is unlocated.

References

Populated places in ancient Attica
Former populated places in Greece
Demoi
Lost ancient cities and towns